Gelfand is a surname meaning "elephant" in the Yiddish language. Notable people with the surname include:

 Alexander Gelfond (1906–1968), Soviet mathematician
 Michael Gelfond, American computer scientist

See also
 Gelfand
 Helfand
 Helfant

Yiddish-language surnames